The following highways are numbered 592:

United States